Patrick Hickey may refer to:

 Patrick Hickey (artist) (1927–1998), Irish visual artist
 Pat Hickey (ice hockey) (born 1953), Canadian ice hockey player
 Pat Hickey (footballer) (1871–1946), Australian rules footballer
 Pat Hickey (politician) (1882–1930), New Zealand trade unionist
 Patrick Hickey (politician) (born 1950), American politician
 Pat Hickey (sports administrator) (born 1945), Irish IOC member since 1995